Cinta Pertama may refer to:

 Cinta Pertama (1973 film), directed by Teguh Karya and starring Christine Hakim
 Cinta Pertama (2006 film), starring Bunga Citra Lestari